Ribafria is a former civil parish, located in the municipality of Alenquer, in western Portugal. In 2013, the parish merged into the new parish Ribafria e Pereiro de Palhacana. It covers 9.10 km2 in area, with 974 inhabitants as of 2001.

References

Former parishes of Alenquer, Portugal